Ebony Elizabeth Thomas is an American writer and educator who is a professor at the University of Michigan School of Education. Her research considers children's literature and fan culture. Her book, The Dark Fantastic, was awarded the 2020 Children's Literature Association Book Award.

Education and early career 
Thomas was born and raised in Detroit. She studied English education at Florida A&M University, then completed her master's degree at Wayne State University, with a focus on American literature. Thomas joined the University of Michigan for doctoral research, where she studied discourse conflicts in schooling and society.

After graduating, Thomas worked a teacher in the Detroit Public Schools Community District. She taught high school English and creative writing. She held various positions on the National Council of Teachers of English, including the Conference on English Education's executive committee. She completed her research in the Pinnacle Classroom Discourse Study Group, a collective of teachers committed to ending the racial awarding gap.

Research 
Thomas was appointed an assistant professor at Wayne State University in 2010, where she spent two years before moving to the University of Pennsylvania. In Pennsylvania, Thomas focused on African-American education. In 2021, Thomas joined the faculty of the University of Michigan School of Education.

Thomas is an expert in children's literature, and has argued that it can be a site of social progress. She has investigated the representation of slavery and diversity within children's books.

Thomas was appointed to the advisory board of the Teaching Hard History project. She has researched the representation of people of colour in children's and adult's American literature, and argued that white Americans do not readily share space with non-whites. “When it comes down to it, sharing space means actually giving up something that you’ve always had: giving up power, giving up the spotlight, giving up money so that you can share that space. And that’s hard for folks.” In 2022, the public criticisms of a Black actress playing the role of Ariel in the live-action retelling of The Little Mermaid prompted Thomas to remark that policing the inclusion of characters of color in adaptions of fictional narratives amounts to an "imagination gap".

Writing
Thomas' book The Dark Fantastic was released in 2019. The book presents the concept of a "Dark Other" subjected to cycle of "spectacle, hesitation, violence, haunting, and emancipation, using Amandla Stenberg as Rue, Angel Coulby as Gwen, Kat Graham as Bonnie Bennett, and Noma Dumezweni as Hermione as examples. She presents the fantasy and imagination in Black feminism as a means to generate new possibilities. The book was described by the Los Angeles Review of Books as "One of the most radiant and thought-provoking descriptions of the potentials of fantastic literature".

Harry Potter and the Other was released in 2022. The book explores race matters in the wizarding world created by J. K. Rowling.

Awards and honors
 2020 British Fantasy Awards, Nonfiction
 2020 World Fantasy Awards
 2020 Children's Literature Association Book Award

Selected publications

References 

American writers
Living people
American academics
World Fantasy Award winners
Writers from Detroit
University of Michigan faculty
University of Michigan alumni
Wayne State University alumni
Year of birth missing (living people)